Who's The Murderer is a Chinese variety program produced by Mango TV. The show features the main cast of He Jiong, Sa Beining, as well as resident guests Wang Ou, Gui Gui (Emma Wu) and Bai Jingting.

The show was licensed from JTBC's Crime Scene.

Format

Season 1 (2016)
In a prologue, the cast is introduced to the settings and suspects of a murder case for the new episode. The cast then chooses their role in the episode, as a particular suspect or the detective. Other than the detective, each person is given detailed information about the suspect they are portraying including their personalities, alibi, relationship to the victim and other suspects, history, criminal motive, etc. Every suspect can conceal information until explicitly questioned by other suspects or the detective, but only the criminal can lie.
 Alibi: Each player introduces themselves as the suspect they are portraying, gives some background information about their relationship with the victim, and describes their whereabouts before, during and after the crime.
On-Site Investigation: The players are separated into two teams, and given ten minutes to investigate the crime scene for clues. Each player is given a camera, and is allowed to take a maximum of ten pictures.
 Briefing: All players present the evidence they have collected, and are allowed to ask other players questions concerning evidence. Each player voices out who they currently think is the criminal after their briefing.
 First Criminal Vote:  The detective is allowed to make a vote  on who they suspect after hearing each player's briefing. The vote is made publicly to all of the players.
 Additional On-Site Investigation: All the players gather at the crime scene for additional investigation and discussion. This segment is run at the same time as the 1-on-1 Interrogation.
 1-on-1 Interrogation: The detective who is always innocent can summon the other players into the interrogation room for further questionings.  
 Final Criminal Vote: After all of the players have been interrogated, the game proceeds to the final vote. All players makes their final statement and debriefing of the case would be conducted by the Detective. 5 minutes of individual investigations would be permitted before each player secretly votes for who they think is the final criminal. The player who receives the most votes is arrested and locked in a makeshift prison. If the person is indeed the criminal, the detective receives two gold bars, and the innocent players receive one each. If the arrested person is not the criminal, the true culprit gets all the gold bars.

Season 2 (2017)
In the second season, minor changes were made to the format of the show. The gold bars are given to the cast members beforehand. If they vote correctly, they can keep the gold bar. If not, they will have to return it. When the cast members are choosing their roles, they do not know who is the detective until they open their character cards. 
The detective is no longer allowed to make his first vote publicly, so that the cast will not be influenced. At the end of the game, if the right suspect is voted as the criminal, only those who voted correctly get to keep their gold bars. Detectives voting correctly both times get two gold bars. Suspects successfully hiding their identity get all six gold bars.
In episode 12, all six cast members are suspects.

Season 3 (2017)
In the third season, all the scenes have become realistic, in which the cast members experience the whole crime setting themselves. Props and the background of the cases are all original and solid, such as the hotel in episode one.
There are one to two victims for each case, making the cases far more complex than the previous two seasons.

Season 4 (2018)
Season 4 began in October 2018, and continued to use actual sets for some of the episodes. The detective's assistant role, which appeared briefly in Season 2, was brought back for this season and played by various university students.

Season 5 (2019)
Season 5 began in November 2019, and in the first episode an actual location (cruise ship) was used as a set instead of a production set which was utilized in previous seasons. The detective's assistant role has also returned for this season, and the format of the previous seasons appear to have been unchanged in this season.

Season 6 (2020) 
Season 6 began in December 2020. This season has a new addition of the double detective mode. Double detective mode means there are now 7 players in total and the detective's get to cast two votes each. Other than that the format is the same as the previous seasons.

Season 7 (2022) 
Season 7 began in January 2022. This season is the first season where Benny Sa is absent from the cast. In replacement, Wowkie Da and Zhang Ruoyun joined the regular cast, while Wang Ou, Vision Wei and Yang Rong became recurring members. While this season continued the double detective mode, the detective's assistant only gets to vote once during the second voting round. Another change was the change from gold bars to detective badges for scoring. Similar to the previous seasons, if the criminal is caught, the detective gets badges equal to the number of times they voted correctly, and the assistant and other players get a badge if they voted correctly. If the criminal wins, they win 6 detective badges. Players also vote for the MVP at the end of the episode, and each episode's MVP earns one badge. The winners of episode 0, the prior gathering, also earn one badge each. At the end of the season, among all the cast members (except for fixed member He Jiong), the four cast members with the most badges earn the title of "Stellar Detective".

Season 8 (2023)

Main Cast

Recurring Cast

Episodes

Series overview

Season 1 (2016)

Season 2 (2017)

Season 3 (2017)

Season 4 (2018)

Season 5 (2019)

Season 6 (2020)

Season 7 (2022)

Disappearance of Sa

(Spoilers for Season 7) 
To deal with Sa Beining not being able to join the filming for Season 7 due to work issues, a special over-arching story was told in Season 7.

In Episode 0, it's revealed that Detective Sa, leader of the Famous Detective Agency on Mango Planet, had gone missing while investigating a special case. Detective He was made deputy leader and given the Season long task of tracking down Sa.

In Episode 1, Sa is referenced when a doll with his likeness is found and stated to be irreparably broken.

In Episode 2, Sa is again referenced when the cast finds his character's building access card defaced.

In Episode 3, the cast finds mention of Emperor Sa mysteriously disappearing in the historical records.

In Episode 4, the cast briefly discovers an SOS message from Sa hidden in a radio broadcast.
Detetive He then tells the cast that he suspects Sa is in danger.

In Episode 6, Sa's NZND character is revealed to be in a coma.

In Episode 10, it is revealed that planet M is undergoing an ice age. A mysterious group called "Watcher" has come to the conclusion that because places warm up when visitors from planet Mango arrive to help solve murders, to save the planet more murders must occur.
Detective Sa under an old alias of 'Animal Sa' had visited the bunker to investigate the situation.
Psychologist Bai from, who worked for "Watcher", also visited the bunker and ended up giving the murderer the plan for the murder for that episode. 
At the end of Episode 10, Detective He receives a fax from Detective Sa saying the truth will be revealed in Ding Niu City.

In Episode 11, the entire episode revolves around the resolution of "Watcher" and Detective Sa's conflict.
Five of the seven players are revealed to be murderers from episodes in previous seasons. Sa had kept in touch with each of them to try and help them reform and become better people.
When Detective Sa had discovered the crisis on Planet M and the existence of Watcher, he went to try and investigate.
Eventually Sa discovers that "Watcher" is an AI developed by Mathematician He to save the planet with his observation that they need to bring more people from Planet Mango to Planet M to warm it up, even if it means more murders.
Sa realizes that Mathematician He was wrong in his theory because when his NZND character awoke from the coma, he discovered that the elderly home was warm and free from the effects of the ice age, despite the Planet Mango beings having left long ago.
Sa realizes that it was not the arrival of planet Mango beings to solve the murders that brought warmth but the love and friendship they displayed whilst solving the murders, the same love and friendship that the NZND members in the elderly home continued to exhibit, thus warming their region.
It is finally revealed that Mayor Zhen, Mathematician He's partner,  accidentally enabled the Watcher AI to have full autonomy and kill as required, resulting in his own death as well.
Watcher then planned to murder Sa to silence him.

Season 8 (2023)

Controversies

Temporary suspension
The second episode of season 3 was pulled down 30 minutes before the show was due to be uploaded to streaming website Mango TV on September 29. The crew of Who's the Murderer responded by saying that "the show needed more time to optimise the plot". The episodes returned online on November 3.

Season 7 episode 6's modification 
Season 7 episode 6 was originally slated to be "Revenge of the Puppet 2", with guests Zhang Ruoyun, Da Zhangwei, Qi Wei, Deng Lun and Wang Mian. However, due to Deng Lun's tax evasion scandal, the broadcast of this episode was cancelled and "The Wise Elderly Life" was uploaded a week early instead.

Show content being maliciously interpreted 
In season 7 episode 6, Justin Huang portrayed the character of an elderly man. Cast member He Jiong joked that he did not respect elderly people as he was not wearing long johns. Following which, the hot search "He Jiong says Justin Huang does not respect elderly" began trending on Weibo. The show responded by saying that "since the show was uploaded, there have been many malicious misinterpretations of the show content online meant to incite negative emotions. Regarding the malicious attacks on the show content, we have immediately handed relevant evidence to Weibo officials, and have used legal means to maintain our rights."

References

External links 
 Official website for season 1
 Official website for season 2
 Program's Weibo account

2016 Chinese television series debuts
Chinese-language television shows
Chinese variety television shows
Chinese television series based on South Korean television series
Mango TV original programming